The Reverend Charles Hutton Coates (4 May 1857 – 15 February 1922) was a clergyman who also played international rugby union for England. An all round sportsman, he competed,  in archery, at the 1908 Summer Olympics in London for Great Britain.

Sporting career
Coates made his England international début in rugby union against Scotland on 28 February 1880. He would go on to earn three caps, with his final match, also against Scotland, on 4 March 1882.

At the Olympics, Coates entered the men's double York round event in 1908, taking 18th place with 418 points.

References

 Buchanan, Ian  British Olympians. Guinness Publishing (1991) 
 
 

1857 births
1922 deaths
Archers at the 1908 Summer Olympics
British male archers
Cambridge University R.U.F.C. players
England international rugby union players
English rugby union players
Leeds Rhinos players
Olympic archers of Great Britain
Rugby union forwards
Rugby union players from Lambeth
Yorkshire Wanderers players